Fred J. Hart (March 8, 1906 – August 8, 1983) was an American businessman and politician.

Hart was born in Streator, Illinois. He went to the Streator public schools and to Rice University. Hart worked in the bank and loan business in Streator. He served as the Streator city clerk from 1931 to 1938 and as the LaSalle County Treasurer from 1938 to 1942. Hart served in the Illinois House of Representatives from 1943 to 1950 and in the Illinois Senate from 1951 to 1966. Hart was a Republican. Hart died at his home in Streator, Illinois.

Notes

1906 births
1983 deaths
People from Streator, Illinois
Businesspeople from Illinois
County officials in Illinois
Republican Party members of the Illinois House of Representatives
Republican Party Illinois state senators
20th-century American politicians
20th-century American businesspeople